Para-cycling at the 2017 ASEAN Para Games was held at two locations in the Klang Valley. Track cycling was held in Nilai Velodrome, Negeri Sembilan whereas Road Cycling was held in Putrajaya.

Classification
 B – tandem bicycle
This class is for athletes who have visual impairments and therefore ride tandem bicycles with a guide (known as a pilot). They may have any level of visual impairment from no light perception in either eye through to a visual acuity of 6/60 and/or a visual field of less than 20 degrees.

 H (1–5) – handcycle
This class is for athletes who are lower limb amputees, have paraplegia or tetraplegia and ride a handcycle using arms to turn pedals for propulsion. H1–4 cyclists compete in a lying position, whereas H5 cyclists compete in a kneeling position.

 T (1–2) – tricycle
This class is for athletes who have a neurological condition or an impairment which has a comparable effect on their cycling so that they are not able to compete on a standard bicycle for reasons of balance.

 C (1–5) – standard bicycle
This class is for athletes with moderate locomotion impairment who do not require a tricycle. In many cases a modification will be allowed to accommodate a leg or arm prosthesis.

Medal tally

Medalists

Road cycling

Men's events

Women's events

Mixed events

Track cycling

Men's events

Women's events

Mixed events

See also
Cycling at the 2017 Southeast Asian Games

References

External links
 Cycling Games Result system

2017 ASEAN Para Games
Cycling at the ASEAN Para Games
ASEAN Para Games